Caloboletus yunnanensis is a bolete fungus native to Yunnan province in China, where it grows under Pinus yunnanensis.

References

External links

yunnanensis
Fungi described in 2014
Fungi of China